White Columns is New York City’s  oldest alternative non-profit art space. White Columns is known as a showcase for up-and-coming artists, and is primarily devoted to emerging artists who are not affiliated with galleries. All work submitted is looked at by the director. Some of the artists receive studio visits and some of those artists are exhibited. White Columns maintained a slide registry of emerging artists, which is now an online curated artist registry.

History and locations
White Columns was founded in 1970 in the SoHo neighborhood of New York City by Jeffrey Lew and Gordon Matta-Clark. It was then known as 112 Workshop/112 Greene Street.

In 1979 it relocated to 325 Spring Street and was renamed White Columns. Directors of White Columns have included Josh Baer, Tom Solomon, Bill Arning, Paul Ha, Lauren Ross, and current director Matthew Higgs.

In 1991 it moved to Christopher Street in Greenwich Village. In 1998, White Columns moved to its present location on the border of Greenwich Village and the Meatpacking District, initiated by then-director Ha, who inaugurated the space with the exhibition "Inventory".

Since being founded, White Columns has supported and provided exposure to hundreds of artists including Alice Aycock, Stephen Laub, Willoughby Sharp, Kiki Smith, Sonic Youth, Andres Serrano, Lorna Simpson, John Currin, Cady Noland, Tyler Turkle, Sarah Sze, Lutz Bacher and others. To this day, White Columns continues its support for artists with an ongoing program of exhibitions and to hundreds of other artists through their online Artist Registry.

112 Workshop 
From 1970 to 1980 112 Workshop was an Artists-run studio and exhibition space that helped to define Minimal conceptual art and Post-conceptual art practice in New York City. It was founded by Jeffrey Lew and Gordon Matta-Clark at 112 Greene Street in Soho. The space contributed to the development of Conceptual art and Postmodern dance of the early 1970s and Post-conceptual art in the late-1970s. In 1979 it relocated to 325 Spring Street, and was renamed White Columns.

Participating artists
At 112 Workshop, artists were given free rein to produce, experiment and challenge art orthodoxies. In this crumbling large space, Gordon Matta-Clark installed his work Walls Paper in 1972. Vito Acconci locked himself in a tiny room with a fighting cock in a piece he called Combination (1971). Following their first New York performance at the Leo Castelli Gallery, Richard Landry and Musicians presented five concerts at 112 in March of 1972 and Carmen Beuchat presented her dance/performance Mass in C B Minor or the Brown Table the same year (1972).

Homage Exhibition
In 2011, David Zwirner Gallery presented the exhibition 112 Greene Street: The Early Years (1970–1974).

Notes

References
 Jessamyn Fiore (ed.), 112 Greene Street: The Early Years, 1970–1974, Radius Books, 2012
 Krenz, Marcel. Random Order. Flash Art. July–Sept. 2003: 67–69.
 Brenson, Michael. 'Structures,' Exhibition at White Columns. The New York Times. December 13, 1985
 Robyn Brentano and Mark Savitt (eds.), 112 Workshop/112 Greene Street: History, Artists & Artwork, New York University Press, 1981 

Contemporary art galleries in the United States
1970 establishments in New York (state)
Art museums and galleries in Manhattan
Art galleries established in 1970
SoHo, Manhattan

Discography
 Noise Festival Tape (1982) TSoWC White Columns

Notes

References
 Krenz, Marcel. “Random Order.” Flash Art. July–Sept. 2003: 67–69.
 White Columns History
 Brenson, Michael. "'Structures,' Exhibition at White Columns." The New York Times. December 13, 1985

External links

 White Columns

Contemporary art galleries in the United States
1970 establishments in New York (state)
Art museums and galleries in Manhattan
Art galleries established in 1970
Greenwich Village